Zdravković (Cyrillic script: Здравковић) is a Serbian surname derived from a masculine given name Zdravko. It may refer to:

 Boban Zdravković (born 1962), folk singer
 Dragan Zdravković (born 1959), middle-distance runner
 Toma Zdravković (1938–1991), folk singer
 Živojin Zdravković (1914–2001), conductor and professor
 Milija Zdravković (1765-1814), voivode of the First Serbian Uprising and the father of Milosav and Dobrosav
 Milosav Zdravković (1787-1854), voivode of the first and second Serbian revolution
 Novica Zdravković (1947–2021), folk singer
 Dobrosav Zdravković (1789- ?), brother of Milosav and also a Serbian revolutionary
 Marijan Zdravković, Serbian revolutionary

Serbian surnames
Patronymic surnames
Surnames from given names